Loisy may refer to:

Surname
Alfred Loisy (1857-1940), French theologian

Places
Loisy, Meurthe-et-Moselle, a commune in the French region of Lorraine
Loisy, Saône-et-Loire, a commune in the French region of Bourgogne
Loisy-en-Brie, a commune in the French region of Champagne-Ardenne
Loisy-sur-Marne, a commune in the French region of Champagne-Ardenne
Grivy-Loisy,  a commune in the French region of Ardennes